The small, uninhabited island of Liebes lies in the Baltic Sea, in the lagoon of Varbelvitzer Bodden between the islands of Rügen and Ummanz. It is a good 1,000 metres long, up to 200 metres wide and its highest point lies just 1.5 metres above sea level. The name of the island could be derived from the Slavic word Lipa = "lime tree".

Just like its three very small neighbours, Urkevitz, Mährens and Wührens, it lies within the West Pomeranian Lagoon Area National Park and, as a bird reserve, is out-of-bounds to unauthorised persons.

German islands in the Baltic
Bird reserves in Germany
Ummanz
Islands of Mecklenburg-Western Pomerania
Uninhabited islands of Germany